Porin is a Croatian music award founded by Croatian Phonographic Association, Croatian Musicians Union, Croatian Radiotelevision and Croatian Composers' Society.

Special awards

Lifetime Achievement Award
The following individuals have received Lifetime Achievement Awards, listed by year.

General categories

Album of the Year

Song of the Year
Equivalent to the American Grammy Award for Record of the Year, awards in this category are given for a single song and presented to the artist who recorded it.

Best video

Genre-specific awards

Best Club Album
This category was introduced in 2001 and was originally called Best hip-hop album. Between 2002 and 2009 it was called Best Urban and Club Music Album and in 2010 it was shortened to Best Club Music Album.

Best Pop Album

Best Rock Album

References

External links
 

Awards established in 1994
Croatian music industry
European music awards
1994 establishments in Croatia